Norlela binti Ariffin is a Malaysian politician who is a Penang State executive councillor.

Election results

References 

Living people
People from Penang
Malaysian people of Malay descent
 People's Justice Party (Malaysia) politicians
21st-century Malaysian politicians
Year of birth missing (living people)
Members of the Penang State Legislative Assembly
 Penang state executive councillors